was a Japanese sumo wrestler from Goshogawara, Aomori, Japan. His highest rank was ōzeki.

Career
Making his debut in January 1917, he was promoted to the top makuuchi division in January 1923 and made the fourth komusubi rank in January 1926, although he did not take part in that tournament. He competed in the maegashira ranks in 1927 but left the Japan Sumo Association temporarily and was not listed on the banzuke ranking sheets in the March and May 1928 tournaments. Returning in October 1928 he was listed at the bottom of the jūryō division and after winning two jūryō tournament titles he returned to the top division in 1930.

Shimizugawa was promoted to the second highest rank of ōzeki in 1932 but never made the highest yokozuna rank, despite winning a total of three top division tournament championships. He was overlooked for promotion while two men with inferior records to him, Musashiyama and Minanogawa, were both promoted to yokozuna instead. It has been suggested that this was because Shimizugawa belonged to a small stable, Hatachiyama, whereas Musashiyama and Minanogawa were both members of much larger and more influential stables (Dewanoumi and Takasago, respectively).

Retirement from sumo
After finishing as runner-up in the May 1937 tournament, his fifth runner-up performance, Shimizugawa announced his retirement. He remained in the sumo world as an elder under the name Oitekaze Oyakata, and was head coach of the Oitekaze stable. Among the wrestlers he produced was a komusubi to whom he gave his old shikona or fighting name, Shimizugawa Akio.

Career Record 
In 1927 Tokyo and Osaka sumo merged and four tournaments a year in Tokyo and other locations began to be held.

  
    
    
  
  
    
    
  
  
    
    
  
  
    
    
  
  
    
    
  
  
    
    
  
  
    
    
  
  
    
    
  
  
    
    
  
  
    
    
  

    
    
    
    
  
  
    
    
    
    
  

    
    
    
    
  

    
    
    
    
  

    
    
    
    
  

    
    
    
    
  

    
    
    
  
  
    
    
    
  
  
    
    
    
  
  
    
    
    
  

    
    
  

*Shimizugawa was runner-up in his final tournament in May 1937

See also
Glossary of sumo terms
List of sumo tournament top division champions
List of past sumo wrestlers
List of ōzeki

References

1900 births
1967 deaths
Japanese sumo wrestlers
People from Goshogawara
Sumo people from Aomori Prefecture
Ōzeki